"Time Is Just The Same" is an EP released by former Belle & Sebastian member Isobel Campbell, featuring contributions by Mark Lanegan. The album was released in April 2004.

Track listing
"Time Is Just The Same"
"Why Does My Head Hurt So?"
"Bordello Queen"
"Bang-Bang"
"The Breeze Whispered Your Name (pt.2)"
"Argomenti (live)"

References

External links
 Official website Info on the album
 Time Is Just The Same Album

2004 singles